Devils & Angels  is the second studio album by the pop rock band Mêlée. It was released in 2007 through Warner Bros., the group's first release for the record company. The album was produced by Howard Benson and mixed by Tim Palmer at Paramount Studios.

Track listing
All songs were written and composed by Chris Cron and Ricky Sans, except where noted.

 "Built to Last" - 3:41
 "Rhythm Of Rain" - 3:41
 "Frequently Baby (She's a Teenage Maniac)" - 2:51
 "For a Lifetime" - 3:41
 "Drive Away" - 3:20
 "Can't Hold On"  - 4:39
 "Imitation" - 3:33
 "Love Carries On" - 3:12
 "She's Gonna Find Me Here" - 3:38
 "Biggest Mistake" - 2:41
 "You Got" - 3:08
 "Stand Up" - 4:11
 "You Make My Dreams" (Hall & Oates cover) - 3:02
 "New Heart" (Japanese bonus track) - 2:46
 "Sick" (Japanese bonus track) - 2:59

Personnel 

Craig Aaronson – A&R
Jeremy Barnett – vocals (background)
Howard Benson – keyboards, programming, producer
Lenny Castro – percussion
Chris Cron – guitar, piano, arranger, vocals
Karen Cron – vocals (background)
Paul DeCarli – digital editing
Brian "Big Bass" Gardener – mastering
Hatsukazu "Hatch" Inagaki – assistant engineer
Lina Kumon – vocals (background)
Frank Maddocks – design, creative director
Ryan Malloy – bass, arranger, vocals
Mike Nader – arranger, drums, vocals
Jon Nicholson – drum technician
Mark O'Donoughue – Mixing
Holly Palmer – vocals (background)
Tim Palmer – mixing
Cindi Peters – mixing coordinator
Mike Plotnikoff – engineer
Ricky Sans – guitar, arranger, vocals
Derrick Santini – photography
Adam Schlesinger – arranger, pre-production
Jamie Seyberth – assistant engineer, mixing assistant
Marc VanGool – guitar technician
Phil X – guitar

Chart positions

Release history

References

External links

2007 albums
Mêlée (band) albums